Mulvane may refer to:
Mulvane, Kansas, a city in Sedgwick and Sumner Counties, Kansas
Mulvane, West Virginia, a community in Fayette County, West Virginia